The Japan national rugby sevens team participates in competitions such as the World Rugby Sevens Series and the Rugby World Cup Sevens.

Tournament history

Summer Olympic Games

Rugby World Cup Sevens

Asian Games

Hong Kong Sevens
Japan won the Plate match at the 1980 and 1999 Hong Kong Sevens.

In the 2007 Hong Kong Sevens, Japan reached Bowl semi-finals (19th place), where they lost against France; previously they had beaten Asian rivals China and Chinese Taipei. In 2008, they lost all four matches versus South Africa, Argentina, Russia and Hong Kong.

Japan won in 2009 against China and Sri Lanka, after which they lost the Bowl semi-finals versus Portugal. In 2010 they beat Hong Kong but were defeated by Scotland in Bowl quarter-finals, so they ended 13th.

The team won in 2011 against China, Scotland and the United States, then were beaten by Canada in the Bowl final to end 9th.

In the 2012 World Series qualifier at Hong Kong, Japan were defeated by Portugal and Russia and won against Guyana in the group phase. The team won against Hong Kong in quarter-finals, but was defeated by Spain in semi-finals and Portugal in the third-place match. so they failed to qualify for the World Series.

In the 2013 World Series pre-qualifier at Hong Kong, the team won all group phase matches against Brazil, Georgia and Jamaica. However, Georgia beat them in quarter-finals.

In the 2014 World Series qualifier at Hong Kong, Japan won the three group phase matches against Uruguay, Cook Islands and Trinidad and Tobago. Later they beat Tunisia, Russia and Italy to claim World Series core status for 2014/15.

Sevens World Series
Japan won the Plate final match (5th place) at the 2000 Japan Sevens, scoring 8 points for the 1999–2000 World Sevens Series. The team lost the Bowl final match to end 10th in the 2002 Australia Sevens and 2002 Singapore Sevens.

In the 2012 USA Sevens they reached Bowl semifinals (11th place). In the 2014 Japan Sevens they repeated that result.

Japan became a core team for the 2014–15 Sevens World Series. As hosts of the 2015 Japan Sevens, they won over Samoa, tied Argentina and lost to France to advance to Cup quarter-finals. They were defeated by Fiji and then Scotland, therefore resulting 7th in the tournament. However, they resulted last in seven out of ten events and finished 15th, therefore the team lost its core team status for 2015–16.

At the 2016 Wellington Sevens, Japan defeated France to reach Bowl semi-finals, where they lost to Scotland, therefore claiming 11th place. The team advanced to Cup quarter-finals of the 2016 USA Sevens after winning over Scotland and drawing versus England. They lost to Fiji and defeated Kenya to reach the Plate final, where they fell to New Zealand to clinch 6th place.

Team

Current squad

Former squads

Coaches
 Wataru Murata - head coach from February 28, 2008
 Kensuke Iwabuchi - coach from February 28, 2008

See also

 World Sevens Series
 Rugby World Cup Sevens
 Japan national rugby union team

References

External links
Official website
WorldRugby profile

 
National rugby sevens teams
sevens